Castles and Dreams is a DVD released by the band Blackmore's Night in 2005. It was released as a Region 2 DVD on May 30, 2005 after being pushed back multiple times. It was released as a Region 1 DVD on October 11, 2005.  "Castles and Dreams" is a song by Blackmore’s Night from their 1999 album Under a Violet Moon.

In 2008 the DVD went Gold in Germany.

Track listing

Disc 1

Concert Burg Veldenstein- Burg Neuhaus 2004
 Intro 00:55 
Cartouche 06:01
Queen for a Day I 03:23 
Queen for a Day II 02:22
Under a Violet Moon 5:31
Minstrel Hall 03:13
Past Times With Good Company 06:00
Soldier of Fortune 03:52 
Durch den Wald zum Bach Haus 04:36
Once in a Million Years 04:27
Mr. Peagram's Morris And Sword 02:15
Home Again 08:17
Ghost of a Rose 07:45
Child in Time / Mond Tanz 06:25
Wind in the Willows 05:51
Village on the Sand 07:21
Renaissance Faire 05:11
The Clock Ticks On 09:10
Loreley 03:59
All for One 08:32
Black Night 06:12 
Dandelion Wine 4:51

Bonus Material
Behind the Scenes
Ritchie Blackmore Guitar Special

Disc 2

Acoustics
I Think it's Going to Rain Today (music and lyrics by Randy Newman)- Burg Rheinfels
Christmas Eve- Burg Waldeck 2004
Shadow of the Moon
Queen for a Day
Under a Violet Moon

Videos
The Times They Are A Changin'
Way to Mandalay
Once in a Million Years
Hanging Tree
Christmas Eve

Documentaries
Blackmore's Night: The Story
Once Upon a Time: The Ritchie and Candice Story
Tour Start: St. Goar 2004
Hanging Tree: Making Music with Our Friends
Schlossgeister- German TV Special
Goldene Henne- German TV Appearance
Fernsehgarten- German TV Appearance

Proclamations
Discography- Blackmore's Night
Biography- Candice Night
Biography- Ritchie Blackmore
Interview- Band and Members

Special Bonus
Slide Show
Candice Night Private Movies

References

External links
Castles and Dreams review at BellaOnline

Blackmore's Night video albums
2005 video albums
2005 live albums
Live video albums